Zupan is an English rendering (spellings in other languages vary rather widely) of the following Slavic words:

 Župan, an administrative title in South Slavic languages
 Żupan, a Polish garment
 Zupan (surname)